Tattwabodhini Patrika (Tattwabodhini "truth-searching" Patrika "newspaper") was established by Debendranath Tagore on 16 August 1843, as a journal of the Tattwabodhini Sabha, and continued publication until 1883. It was published from Kolkata, India. Its editorial board including Debendranath Tagore, Ishwar Chandra Vidyasagar, Akshay Kumar Dutta, Rajnarayan Basu, Rajendralal Mitra and Dwijendranath Tagore.

See also
 Sulabh Samachar

References

External links

 
 

Publications established in 1843
Bengali-language newspapers published in India
Defunct newspapers published in India
Bengal Renaissance
19th century in Kolkata
Brahmoism
1843 establishments in British India